"Poupée de cire, poupée de son" (English: "Wax doll, rag doll") is a song written by Serge Gainsbourg and recorded by French singer France Gall. It is best known as the Luxembourgian winning entry at the Eurovision Song Contest 1965, held in Naples.

The song was inspired by the 4th movement (Prestissimo in F minor) from Beethoven's Piano Sonata No. 1. It was nominated as one of the 14 best Eurovision songs of all time at the Congratulations special held in October 2005.

As is common with Gainsbourg's lyrics, the words are filled with double meanings, wordplay, and puns. The title can be translated as "wax doll, rag doll" (a floppy doll stuffed with bran or chaff) or as "wax doll, sound doll" (with implications that Gall is a "singing doll" controlled by Gainsbourg).

Sylvie Simmons wrote that the song is about "the ironies and incongruities inherent in baby pop"—that "the songs young people turn to for help in their first attempts at discovering what life and love are about are sung by people too young and inexperienced themselves to be of much assistance, and condemned by their celebrity to be unlikely to soon find out."

This sense of being a "singing doll" for Gainsbourg reached a peak when he wrote "Les Sucettes" ("Lollipops") for Gall.

The day after her Eurovision victory the single had sold 16,000 copies in France, four months later it had sold more than 500,000 copies.

Summary of the lyrics
The central image of the song is that the singer identifies herself as a wax doll (poupée de cire), a rag doll (poupée de son).  Her heart is engraved in her songs; she sees life through the bright, rose–tinted glasses of her songs.  Is she better or worse than a fashion doll (poupée de salon)?

Her recordings are like a mirror where anyone can see her.  Through her recordings, it is as though she has been smashed into a thousand shards of voice and scattered so that she is everywhere at once.

This central image is extended, as she refers to her listeners as rag dolls (poupées de chiffon) who laugh, dance to the music, and allow themselves to be seduced for any reason or no reason at all.

But love is not just in songs, and the singer asks herself what good it is to sing about love when she herself knows nothing about boys.

The two concluding verses seem to refer to Gall herself.  In them, she sings that she is nothing but a wax doll, his doll, under the sun of her blond hair. But someday she, the wax doll, will be able to actually live her songs without fearing the warmth of boys.

Self–referentiality, puns, wordplay, and double meanings
Self–referentiality, puns, word play, and double meanings are integral to Gainsbourg's style of lyric writing.  These factors make it difficult for non–French speakers to understand the nuances of the lyrics, and even more difficult to translate the lyrics.

Self–referentiality
At a young age, France Gall was too naïve to understand the second meaning of the lyrics. She felt she was used by Gainsbourg throughout this period, most notably after the song "Sucettes", which was literally about lollipops, but with multiple double entendres referring to oral sex.

Poupée de son can also mean "doll of sound" or "song doll" – France Gall could be said to be the doll through which Gainsbourg channels his sounds.

As Sylvie Simmons wrote in Serge Gainsbourg: A Fistful of Gitanes:

"Poupée . . . " was catchy, and on the surface pretty annoying – perfect Eurovision fodder, in other words – but closer examination revealed perspicacious lyrics about the ironies and incongruities inherent in baby–pop."

In typical Gainsbourg fashion, the song is first of all self–referential in that it is written for a baby–pop performer to sing about herself—complete with reference to Gall singing beneath her "sun of blond hair" and double meanings clearly tying the song to Gall's own life situation: Singing songs created by adults and carrying themes purposefully introduced by those controlling adults which the young performer only partially understands.  Gall herself is the "Poupée de cire, poupée de son" of the song's title.

But the self–referentiality goes far beyond this.  The writing of "Poupée" by Gainsbourg and its performance by Gall is itself an example of this very dynamic at work, and Gainsbourg knew that Gall, at her age, would understand the ramifications of this dynamic only partially, even at the same moment she was performing a song about it.  In writing "Poupée," Gainsbourg is purposefully exploiting the very dynamic that is the subject of the song.

It was this extra dimension, in part, that made the song interesting and attractive to audiences, helping catapult it to the top of the Eurovision contest.

It was this same element that made Gainsbourg feel that this portion of his songwriting output was particularly groundbreaking and daring, yet simultaneously made Gall feel profoundly uncomfortable with this material — that she was being deliberately manipulated and exploited by the adults around her—particularly in retrospect as she matured.

In later years, Gall dissociated herself from the Eurovision Song Contest, and refused to discuss it in public or perform her winning song.

Poupée de cire, poupée de son
In a literal sense, poupée de cire means "wax doll".

Son in the context of poupée de son means 'bran' or 'straw', of the kind used to stuff children's floppy dolls . Poupée de son is a long–standing expression in French meaning "doll stuffed with straw or bran".  It is also used in the expression syndrome du bébé "poupée de son", "floppy baby syndrome" (infantile hypotonia), and can even refer to someone too drunk to stand up.

So in the first place, poupée de son refers to a floppy type of doll like a rag doll, with no backbone of its own but which, like a puppet, is under the control of others.

The double meanings of the two terms cire and son come in because of the subject matter of the lyrics, which contain many references to singing and recording. Cire ('wax') brings to mind the old shellac records, commonly known in France as "wax disks". Son has a second meaning–"sound".

These double meanings are amplified in Gainsbourg's lyrics.  For instance, the first verse refers to the fact that the singer's heart is engraved in her songs, much in the way the sound vibrations are engraved in a wax recording.  A later reference is made to the singer being broken into a thousand pieces of voice, as though she herself is made of sound.

English versions of the lyrics often translate the title as "Wax Doll, Singing Doll", "The lonely singing doll" (the version sung by Twinkle), or something similar—translations that are not literally correct but which capture some of the double meaning implicit in the original version.

As Sylvie Simmons summarized the theme of this song: "The songs young people turn to for help in their first attempts at discovering what life and love are about, are sung by people too young and inexperienced to be of much help and condemned by their celebrity to be unlikely to soon find out."

Voir la vie en rose bonbon
"Voir la vie en rose" means "to see life through rose–tinted glasses", while "rose bonbon" refers to the lurid pink colouring used in children's sweets.

So the entire phrase as found in the lyrics – "Je vois la vie en rose bonbon" — can be translated as something like, "I see life through pink candy–coloured glasses".

Briser en mille éclats de voix
Like "Voir la vie en rose bonbon", "Briser en mille éclats de voix" is a combination of two separate phrases, put together to mean something more than either alone.

"Briser en mille éclats" means "to smash to pieces". "Éclats de voix" means "shouts" or "screams".

Thus "Brisée en mille éclats de voix" could be translated as "Broken in thousand pieces of voice" or "Smashed in a thousand shouts".

Pour un oui, pour un nom
"Celles qui dansent sur mes chansons . . . Elles se laissent séduire pour un oui, pour un nom" translates literally as "Those who dance to my songs . . . They give in to a yes, to a name".

However, the phrase "Se laissent séduire pour un oui, pour un nom" sounds like the phrase "Se laisser séduire pour un oui, pour un non" which means literally "to let themselves be seduced for a yes, for a no".

This can more colloquially translated as "to give in to the slightest temptation" or "to let themselves be seduced for any reason at all".

As Alex Chabot writes:
In this case, the suggestion is that a name, in the context of a casual introduction, for instance, is sufficient. This is really a very subtle, and clever, play on words.

At Eurovision
The song was performed 16th on the night, following 's Birgit Brüel with "For din skyld" and preceding 's Viktor Klimenko with "Aurinko laskee länteen". At the close of voting, it had received 32 points, placing first in a field of 18.

The French public retrospectively reproached Gall and Gainsbourg for having represented [and won for] Luxembourg and not for their own country.

Two years later Sandie Shaw entered the contest and won with another puppet themed song, "Puppet on a String".

In other languages
Versions of "Poupée de cire, poupée de son" in other languages include:
  ("Doll of wax, and doll of bran")
  ("The big rice cooker"), sung by The Chung Brothers, for the animated movie McDull: Rise of the Rice Cooker
  ("Wax doll"), sung by Eva Pilarová and then by Hana Zagorová
  ("Little doll"), sung by Gitte Hænning
  ("The fashion doll") sung by Marijke Merckens (1965) and Was ("Wax"), sung by Spinvis (2007)
 , sung by Twinkle
  ("Wax doll"), sung by Tiiu Varik; Laulev vahanukk ("Singing wax doll"), sung by Evelin Võigemast
  ("Wax doll, singing doll"), sung by Ritva Palukka
  ("That was a nice party"), sung by France Gall; Das Puppenhaus ("The doll's house"), sung by the Swiss singer Cornelia Grolimund (1995)
  ("Wax Doll") by performed by Mária Toldy
  ("Don't be angry, it's not a disaster") by Haim Hefer, performed by Yarkon Bridge Trio;  Bubat kash ("Rag doll"), performed by Gila Edri.
  ("I do, you don't"), sung by France Gall
  ("Dreaming chanson doll"), sung by France Gall; there are also other versions sung by Mieko Hirota, Minami Saori, Fumie Hosokawa and Juju (singer) (October 2015)
  ("The singing wax doll")
  ("Wax doll, doll of sound"), sung by Wanderléa (Brazil) and Madalena Iglésias (Portugal)
  ("Wax doll"), sung by Muslim Magomayev
  ("Wax doll"), sung by Oľga Szabová 
  ("Wax doll"), sung by Karina, Leo Dan and Juán "Corazón" Ramón
  ("I really can't help it, can I?"), sung by Gitte Hænning, Anne–Lie Rydé and Lill–Babs
  ("Doll without love"), sung by Ngọc Lan; a dance version by Mỹ Tâm; Performed on Thúy Nga's Paris By Night 52 by Trúc Lam & Trúc Linh in 1999 at Terrace Theater in Long Beach, California

Covers
 The Swedish metal band Therion did two versions of the song on their album Les Fleurs Du Mal in 2012. They also made a video clip to one of the versions.
 The Spanish group Parchís used part of the main melody in their song "Corazón de plomo" ("Heart made of lead"), talking about a toy soldier, quite similar to the song of France Gall.
 The Spanish singer Javier Corcobado covered the song on his album Fotografiando al corazón, released in 2003.  
 Montreal indie rock band Arcade Fire have sung a cover of "Poupée de Cire, poupée de son" throughout their 2007 tour in promotion of their album Neon Bible. They later released a studio version of it on their split 7-inch single with LCD Soundsystem.
 The German band Welle: Erdball covered the song on their album Chaos Total from 2006.
 The Swiss band Hillbilly Moon Explosion covered the song on their album By Popular Demand, released in 2005.  
 New York City band Les Sans Culottes covered the song on their 2004 album, Fixation Orale.
 Belle and Sebastian performed a live version for the Black Sessions, recorded to video for the Fans Only DVD, released on Jeepster Records.
 Anime series Sugar Sugar Rune uses an altered version of the music in its opening theme.
 The opening theme for the anime series Ai Tenshi Densetsu Wedding Peach, titled "Yumemiru ai tenshi", is both a direct reference to the Japanese version of the song (both start with yumemiru) and samples exactly the same chord progression and parts of the melody.
 The German punk band Wizo had a cover of this song on their album Herrénhandtasche released in 1995.
 The Spanish band Nosoträsh performs a cover in their album Nadie hablará de...
 The Spanish band Nena Daconte performed a cover in the TV programme Eurovisión 2009, el retorno which was broadcast at TVE1 on Saturday 21 February 2009.
 The Spanish singer La Terremoto de Alcorcón performed a cover (titled "Muñeca de Alcorcón" (meaning "Doll of Alcorcón") in the television programme Los mejores años de nuestra vida. Especial Todos con Soraya a Eurovisión, which was broadcast at TVE1 on 12 May 2009.
 Norwegian band Sterk Naken og Biltyvene (SNoB) did a cover of the Norwegian version "Lille Dukke" on their 1994 album Tretten Røde Roser.
 Belgian singer Kim Kay recorded a dance version in 1998.
 Jenifer did a cover in her 2013 album Ma déclaration. It was the first single from the album charting in SNEP in April and May 2013.

Chart positions
By France Gall

Jenifer version

Kim Kay version

Another version of the song was by the Belgian Eurodance singer Kim Kay. It was released on 13 November 1998 on EMI as the third single and as well as the twelfth track from her debut studio album, La Vie en lilali (1998). It is a Eurodance song that was written by Serge Gainsbourg and produced by Phil Sterman and Lov Cook.

Track listing

Charts

Certifications

References

Sources and external links
 Official Eurovision Song Contest site, history by year, 1965.
 Detailed info and lyrics, The Diggiloo Thrush, "Poupée de cire, poupée de son".
 Song lyrics with English translation
 Vietnamese Pop version (01:05:25 – 01:09:50) on Paris By Night 52

1965 songs
France Gall songs
Kim Kay songs
Songs written by Serge Gainsbourg
Philips Records singles
EMI Records singles
French-language songs
Eurovision songs of 1965
Eurovision songs of Luxembourg
Eurovision Song Contest winning songs
Congratulations Eurovision songs
Number-one singles in Norway